Point Comfort is a city in Calhoun County, Texas, United States. It is a part of the Victoria, Texas Metropolitan Statistical Area. The population was 737 at the 2010 census.

Geography

Point Comfort is located in northeastern Calhoun County at  (28.676078, –96.558750), on the east side of Lavaca Bay. Texas State Highway 35 passes through the community, leading southwest across the bay  to Port Lavaca, the Calhoun County seat, and east  to Palacios.

Climate

The climate in this area is characterized by hot, humid summers and generally mild to cool winters.  According to the Köppen Climate Classification system, Point Comfort has a humid subtropical climate, abbreviated "Cfa" on climate maps.

Demographics

2020 Census data

As of the 2020 United States census, there were 603 people, 221 households, and 140 families residing in the city.

2000 Census data
As of the census of 2000, there were 781 people, 284 households, and 214 families residing in the city. The population density was 596.8 people per square mile (230.2/km). There were 393 housing units at an average density of 300.3 per square mile (115.8/km). The racial makeup of the city was 88.99% White, 1.41% African American, 0.26% Native American, 1.79% Asian, 5.89% from other races, and 1.66% from two or more races. Hispanic or Latino of any race were 19.59% of the population.

There were 284 households, out of which 39.4% had children under the age of 18 living with them, 62.7% were married couples living together, 9.9% had a female householder with no husband present, and 24.3% were non-families. 21.1% of all households were made up of individuals, and 11.6% had someone living alone who was 65 years of age or older. The average household size was 2.73 and the average family size was 3.14.

In the city, the population was 30.2% under the age of 18, 7.2% from 18 to 24, 31.8% from 25 to 44, 17.8% from 45 to 64, and 13.1% who were 65 years of age or older. The median age was 33 years. For every 100 females, there were 94.3 males. For every 100 females age 18 and over, there were 94.6 males. The median income for a household in the city was $44,500, and the median income for a family was $49,653. Males had a median income of $35,625 versus $23,571 for females. The per capita income for the city was $19,202. About 7.5% of families and 11.8% of the population were below the poverty line, including 20.6% of those under age 18 and 8.2% of those age 65 or over.

Education
Point Comfort is served by the Calhoun County Independent School District. The city was served by Point Comfort Elementary School (Point Comfort), but is now closed, Travis Middle School (Port Lavaca) and Calhoun High School (Port Lavaca)

Economy
Point Comfort is the site of a controversial Formosa PVC plant, site of both the Formosa Plastics propylene explosion as well as large-scale waste violations that resulted in the largest citizen-led settlement of a Clean Water Act suit in the United States. In 2020, the latter controversy was portrayed in episode 12 ("Point Comfort") of the Netflix series Dirty Money. Plastic pollution continued in Lavaca Bay even after the court settlement.

References

External links

 Handbook of Texas Online article

Cities in Calhoun County, Texas
Cities in Texas
Victoria, Texas metropolitan area
Populated coastal places in Texas